Sri Medan is a state constituency in Johor, Malaysia, that is represented in the Johor State Legislative Assembly.

History

Polling districts 
According to the gazette issued on 24 March 2018, the Sri Medan constituency has a total of 17 polling districts.

Representation history

Election results

References 

Johor state constituencies